Neonerita fenestrata is a moth of the family Erebidae. It was first described by Walter Rothschild in 1910. It is found in Brazil and French Guiana.

Subspecies
Neonerita fenestrata fenestrata Brazil (Amazonas)
Neonerita fenestrata lecourti Toulgoët, 1983 (French Guiana)

References

 

Phaegopterina
Moths of South America
Lepidoptera of Brazil
Environment of Amazonas (Brazilian state)
Moths described in 1983